Chris Vui (born 11 February 1993) is a New Zealand born Samoan rugby union footballer who currently plays as a loose forward for the Bristol Bears in the Gallagher Premiership and for Samoa.

Rugby career

Vui can play second row or back row.

He represented New Zealand Under 20 in the 2013 IRB Junior World Championship in France.

During the 2015 Super Rugby season he made 2 appearances for the Auckland-based  franchise.

Vui played for Worcester Warriors. He moved to Bristol ahead of the 2017/18 season.

He earned his first cap for Samoa during the 2016 November internationals.
Vui became the youngest captain in World Rugby when he skippered Samoa in 2017.

References

External links

1993 births
Living people
New Zealand rugby union players
Rugby union locks
Rugby union flankers
Rugby union number eights
North Harbour rugby union players
Blues (Super Rugby) players
People educated at Massey High School
Samoa international rugby union players
Worcester Warriors players
Bristol Bears players
Expatriate rugby union players in England
New Zealand expatriate sportspeople in England